This is a list of supermarket chains in Estonia. Based on the reports for the 2020 financial year, the market leader was Coop Eesti with 24.4 percent, Selver in second place with 18.3 percent, Maxima in third place with 17.6 percent, Rimi in fourth place with 13.4 percent, Prisma in fifth place with 6 percent, Grossi Toidukaubad in sixth place with 6 percent , seventh is Meie Toidukaubad with 2 percent, eighth is Keila Tarbijate Ühistu. The share of the remaining market participants in the total market is less than a full percent.

References 

Supermarkets
Supermarkets
Estonia